The Manakamana Cable Car is a gondola lift transportation system located in Chitwan, Nepal. The 2,772.2m (9,095ft) line has two stations, connecting Kurintar, Chitwan to Manakamana temple, Gorkha. It provides an aerial link from the base station located inside the cable car station to the peak of the Kafakdada hill, where the Manakamana Temple is located at 1300 metres above sea level and from which the cable car receives its name.

The operation of Nepal's first commercial Cable Car service commenced on 24 November 1998 and was inaugurated by his Royal Highness, the Late Crown Prince Dipendra Bir Bikram Shah. The cable car system is designed by the Doppelmayr Group of Austria, an ISO 9001:2015 certified company and the leading international manufacturer in the aerial ropeway industry.

History 

The Manakamana Devi temple, situated in the Gorkha district of Nepal, is regarded as a wish-fulfilling temple and worshipped by most of the Hindu population around the world. In the Nepali Language, “Mana” meaning heart and “Kamana” meaning wishes hence, making Manakamana the ‘goddess of hearts wishes’.  

The legend of the Manakamana goddess dates back to the 16th-century King Ram Shah of Gorkha, who mysteriously died after witnessing his queen’s divine power as an incarnation of Hindu goddess Durga. Shortly after his death, the queen had to practice the historical and sacrificial custom of ‘sati ’. Lakhan Thapa Magar, a devotee of the queen, grieved and pleaded with the queen before her death and she  promised him that she would reappear soon. Years later when a farmer was ploughing his field, he struck a boulder and to his surprise witnessed the appearance of blood and milk coming from it. Hearing about this phenomenon, Lakhan Thapa was convinced that it was a symbol of the late queen’s return and his wish had come true. The discovery site became the present-day shrine where he chose to devote the rest of his life serving the goddess Manakamana thus, starting a tradition of patrilineal descent of Thapa-Magar priesthood that continues in their 21st generation of devotion.

Stations
The aerial line has two stations:
Base Station (Cheres, Chitwan): Height 
Top Station (Manakamana, Gorkha): Height 

There are currently 34 gondolas with  6 passenger seating capacity each and 3 freight carriers in operation. The cable car ride covers a distance of 2.8 kilometres (1.7mi) in 10 minutes. The cable car system was imported from Austria and guarantees a hundred percent safety, featuring automatically operated generators in case of power failure and hydraulic emergency drive.

Technical Features 

 Horizontal distance: 2774.20 m
 Vertical rise: 1033.60 m
 Inclined distance: 3023.75 m
 Haul rope diameter:  41mm
 Bull wheel diameter: Top 4.8 m, Bottom 4.4 m
 Design speed:  0.3–6m/s
 Operating speed:  3.5–6m/s
 Turn around trip time:  8.24 minute
 Hourly capacity:  660 passengers/hour
 Number of stations: 2
 Number of in-line towers: 20
 Height of tallest tower: 41 m
 Longest free span: 516 m (between Tower 5 and Tower 6 )
 Steepest gradient:  37 degrees

Operating Hours and Maintenance Schedule 

The cable car usually operates during the daytime from 9 am to 5 pm and stops during lunch break from noon to half past one.

The cable car is maintained every day before and after normal operating hours. As per the Doppelmayr protocol, the cable car takes a break for 2–3 days in four month intervals.

Ticket Rates

Documentary and film
It is featured in the 2013 documentary film Manakamana, which is entirely shot inside the cabins.

See also
Chandragiri Cable Car
List of gondola lifts

References

Gondala lifts in Nepal
Buildings and structures in Chitwan District
1998 establishments in Nepal
Buildings and structures in Gorkha District